Love In Idleness is a 1944 comedy play by the British writer Terence Rattigan. A young man with radical left-wing views returns from Canada to discover to his horror that his mother is in a relationship with a wealthy businessman currently serving as Minister for Tank Production.

It was staged in New York with the title O Mistress Mine.

Original production
The play opened (following a pre-London tour) at the Lyric Theatre, London, on 20 December 1944, with the following cast:
Olivia Brown - Lynn Fontanne
Polton - Margaret Murray
Miss Dell - Peggy Dear
Sir John Fletcher - Alfred Lunt
Michael Brown - Brian Nissen
Diana Fletcher - Kathleen Kent
Celia Wentworth - Mona Harrison
Sir Thomas Markham - Frank Forder
Lady Markham - Antoinette Keith

References

Bibliography
 John Russell Taylor. The Rise and Fall of the Well-Made Play. Routledge, 2013.

1944 plays
Plays set in London
Plays by Terence Rattigan
West End plays